The 2011–12 New Zealand V8 season was the thirteenth season of the series, under the NZV8 guise. The season began at Pukekohe on 4 November 2011 and finished at the Hamilton Street Circuit on 22 April 2012 after six championship meetings and one non-championship event.

Teams and drivers
 All teams must adhere to the series' car specification rules. All Holdens must be based upon the body shells of its VT, VX or VY Commodores, with upgrades available to replicate it to a VZ or VE. Similarly for Ford, their cars must be based upon the AU Falcon, with options to replicate the BA.

Calendar

Championship standings

References

External links
 The official website of NZV8

NZ Touring Cars Championship seasons
V8 season
V8 season